TV4 Fakta is a Swedish documentary television channel owned by the TV4 Group. It started broadcasting in 2005.

Much of the programming is taken from A+E Networks.  Since December 2005, the remainder of the schedule is filled with the English language Euronews. The TV4 Group bought a stake in Euronews in June 2006.
 
TV4 Fakta was the first channel owned by the TV4 Group that was not broadcast from Sweden. It is broadcast from Finland, where the advertising laws are more liberal. In November 2006, a Finnish version of the channel, called MTV3 Fakta, was launched in cooperation with MTV3. The channel have been broadcasting from Sweden since 2009. A version for Norway was launched in 2010.

See also
List of documentary television channels
TV4 Group

References

External links
 
 

Television channels in Sweden
TV4 AB
Documentary television channels
Television channels and stations established in 2005